The 1948–49 Cypriot Cup was the 12th edition of the Cypriot Cup. A total of 8 clubs entered the competition. It began on 13 March 1949 with the quarterfinals and concluded on 19 June 1949 with the replay final which was held at GSP Stadium. Anorthosis won their 1st Cypriot Cup trophy after beating APOEL 3–0 in the final.

Format 
In the 1948–49 Cypriot Cup, participated all the teams of the Cypriot First Division.

The competition consisted of three knock-out rounds. In all rounds each tie was played as a single leg and was held at the home ground of the one of the two teams, according to the draw results. Each tie winner was qualifying to the next round. If a match was drawn, extra time was following. If extra time was drawn, there was a replay match.

Quarter-finals

Semi-finals

Final 

Abandoned at 87', due to fights between players and in crowd

Replay final

Sources

Bibliography

See also 
 Cypriot Cup
 1948–49 Cypriot First Division

Cypriot Cup seasons
1948–49 domestic association football cups
1948–49 in Cypriot football